University Stadium may refer to:
 University Stadium (Albuquerque), New Mexico, USA
 University Stadium (West Georgia), Georgia, USA

 University Stadium (Thiruvananthapuram), Kerala, India
 University Stadium (Waterloo, Ontario), Canada
 University Stadium (Winnipeg), Canada

See also
Estadio Universitario (disambiguation)